Ako si Kim Samsoon (International title: My Name is Kim Samsoon) is a 2008 Philippine television drama romantic comedy series broadcast by GMA Network. The series is based on a 2005 South Korean television series My Lovely Sam Soon. Directed by Dominic Zapata, Khryss Adalia and Louie Ignacio, it stars Regine Velasquez in the title role. It premiered on June 30, 2008 on the network's Telebabad line up replacing Babangon Ako't Dudurugin Kita. The series concluded on October 10, 2008 with a total of 75 episodes. It was replaced by LaLola in its timeslot.

Background
My Lovely Sam Soon premiered in South Korea in 2005. The series was a major hit in South Korea and Asia. More than 50.5% of Korean households tuned in to watch the finale, with a viewership rate of over 40%.

Premise
Samsoon's fiancé stood her up at their wedding, and her family's bakery was burned by a fire. She decides to apply as a pastry chef in a restaurant where she crosses paths with Cyrus who will discover Samsoon's talent in baking and hires her to work in his restaurant and offers Samsoon a contract in which she must act as his girlfriend in exchange for money.

Cast and characters

Lead cast
 Regine Velasquez as Kim Samsoon Buot

Supporting cast
 Mark Anthony Fernandez as Cyrus Ruiz
 Wendell Ramos as Harvey De Guzman
 Nadine Samonte as Hannah Villanueva
 Tessie Tomas as Sonia Buot
 Carmi Martin as Roció Ruiz
 Eugene Domingo as Dina
 John Lapus as Marcus
 Sheena Halili as Cynthia
 Marky Lopez as James
 Cheska Eugenio as Amber Ruiz
 Martin Escudero as Kokoy
 Arci Muñoz as Dess
 Pauleen Luna as Cherry Fuentebella
 Dido dela Paz as Samuel Buot
 Maureen Larrazabal as Mau Timbol
 Jennica Garcia as Eliza Buot
 Vangie Labalan as Brenda Timbol
 Marcus Madrigal as Dodong
 Kevin Santos as Aaron
 Stef Prescott as Ivy
 Princess Violago as Gigi
 Jade Lopez as Vicky

Guest cast
 Gene Padilla as Mau's husband
 Toby Alejar as Enrico
 Cheska Garcia as Nicole
 Chinggoy Alonzo as Mr. Sandoval
 Tiya Pusit as a doctor
 Mely Tagasa as a judge
 Madam Auring as Rocha
 Lydia de Vega as Kim Samsoon's trainer

Ratings
According to AGB Nielsen Philippines' Mega Manila household television ratings, the pilot episode of Ako si Kim Samsoon earned a 33.8% rating. While the final episode scored a 38.2% rating.

References

External links
 

2008 Philippine television series debuts
2008 Philippine television series endings
Filipino-language television shows
GMA Network drama series
Philippine romantic comedy television series
Philippine television series based on South Korean television series
Television shows set in the Philippines